The 2014 FIVB Volleyball Men's World Championship was held in Poland from 30 August to 21 September 2014. The tournament featured 24 teams to determine the world champions in men's volleyball. In addition to the host nation Poland, 23 teams qualified for the tournament by means of continental and regional competitions. The matches took place in seven venues across seven Polish cities, with the final being held at Spodek, Katowice.

The tournament was won by the host country Poland, who beat Brazil (who won the previous three titles) in the final. Poland became the third team in the history of the competition to be crowned as champions in their own country, joining the Soviet Union (1952 and 1962) and Czechoslovakia (1966).

563,263 fans watched the matches during the 18-day event, smashing the previous records in the competition. In Italy four years earlier, the total was 339,324, while in Japan in 2006, it was 298,352.

Host
Finals hosts Poland. The tournament was held in seven Poland cities.

Information
On 4 September 2008 the FIVB announced it had agreed a partnership deal for Poland to host the FIVB Volleyball Men's World Championship in 2014. "This will be the biggest and most beautiful sports event in the world, not only in volleyball but throughout the whole sports family," said FIVB Honorary Life President  Rubén Acosta. "Poland – I'm sure about it – will make this championship very special."

Acosta and FIVB President Wei Jizhong agreed the deal in Warsaw following negotiations with the Polish Minister of Sport, Mirosław Drzewiecki; Mirosław Błaszczyk, President of the Board of Administration of Polsat Television; Polsat Television Sports Department Director, Marian Kmita and Polish Volleyball Federation President, Mirosław Przedpełski.

Volleyball in Poland has enjoyed a huge surge in popularity during the 2000s. The Polish Men's team finished as runners-up at the 2006 FIVB Volleyball Men's World Championship in Japan and a year later, Katowice hosted one of the best-ever FIVB Volleyball World League Final Rounds.
The remaining 12 teams were drawn across the bottom three positions of each of the four first round pools.

A record number of 279 teams participated in the qualification process for the 2014 FIVB Volleyball World Championships. This total, coming from 166 national federations across the five FIVB confederations, represents an increase of 65 teams from the previous best of 214 teams from 119 federations for the 2010 World Championships (compared with 102 in 2006, 72 in 2002 and 63 in 1998).

Qualification

The regional qualification stage determined the 24 teams that would compete in the championship competition. Hosts Poland were granted automatic qualification. Regional governing bodies were allocated the remaining 23 spots. Africa was granted three, Asia and Oceania four, Europe eight, North America five, and South America three places.

Pools composition

First round
Teams were seeded in the first three positions of each pool following the serpentine system according to their FIVB World Ranking as of 7 October 2013. FIVB reserved the right to seed the hosts as head of pool A regardless of the World Ranking. All teams not seeded were drawn to take other available positions in the remaining lines, following the World Ranking. The draw was held in Warsaw, Poland on 27 January 2014. Because the CAVB and NORCECA qualification process were in progress on 27 January 2014, the best world rankings of CAVB (13, 15 and 19) and NORCECA (4, 7, 11, 20 and 22) were used when the draw was made. Rankings are shown in brackets except the hosts who ranked 5th.

Second round

Third round
The third round draw was held in Łódź, Poland on 14 September 2014. The 1st ranked teams of pools E and F were placed in different pools, while the second and third placed teams were drawn.

Squads

Venues
It was the first time Poland had hosted an FIVB Volleyball Men's World Championship. Matches were played in Kraków, Gdańsk, Wrocław, Katowice, Łódź, Bydgoszcz and Warsaw.

Pool standing procedure
 Match points
 Number of matches won
 Sets ratio
 Points ratio
 Result of the last match between the tied teams

Match won 3–0 or 3–1: 3 match points for the winner, 0 match points for the loser
Match won 3–2: 2 match points for the winner, 1 match point for the loser

Opening match

The 2014 World Championship began on 30 August with a dream opening match between the hosts and Serbia, who played to a record 62,000 spectators at National Stadium, Warsaw.

First round
All times are Central European Summer Time (UTC+02:00).
The top four teams in each pool qualified for the second round.

Pool A

|}

|}

Pool B

|}

|}

Pool C

|}

|}

Pool D

|}

|}

Second round
All times are Central European Summer Time (UTC+02:00).
The results and the points of the matches between the same teams that were already played during the first round were taken into account for the second round.
The top three teams in each pool qualified for the third round.

Pool E

|}

|}

Pool F

|}

|}

Third round
All times are Central European Summer Time (UTC+02:00).
The top two teams in each pool qualified for the semifinals, whereas the third ranked teams in each pool qualified for the 5th place match.

Pool G

|}

|}

Pool H

|}

|}

Final round
All times are Central European Summer Time (UTC+02:00).

5th–6th places

5th place match

|}

Final four

Semifinals

|}

3rd place match

|}

Final

|}

Final standing

Awards

Most Valuable Player
 Mariusz Wlazły
Best Setter
 Lukas Kampa
Best Outside Spikers
 Ricardo Lucarelli
 Murilo Endres

Best Middle Blockers
 Marcus Böhme
 Karol Kłos
Best Opposite Spiker
 Mariusz Wlazły
Best Libero
 Jenia Grebennikov

Prize money

Prize Money for the Final Standing
Champions – $200,000
Runners-up – $125,000
3rd place – $75,000

Prize Money for the Awards
Most Valuable Player – $30,000
Best Setter – $10,000
Best Outside Spiker – $10,000 (2 players)
Best Middle Blocker – $10,000 (2 players)
Best Opposite Spiker – $10,000
Best Libero – $10,000

Marketing

Sponsors
KGHM Polska Miedź
Polsat
PKN Orlen
Adidas
Samsung
Wirtualna Polska
Plus
Radio ZET

Official song
The competition's official opening song was "Start a Fire" by Margaret. She also performed the song at the 2014 FIVB Volleyball Men's World Championship opening ceremony on August 30 in National Stadium, Warsaw, prior to the Poland v. Serbia match. This event was transmitted in over 168 countries.

Trophy
The FIVB then mandated two young product designers from Switzerland, Thilo Alex Brunner and Jörg Mettler to create the new World Championship trophy. With its unique contemporary design, the trophy has set itself apart from other awards in international competitions across the sporting world. Eichenberger LTD and their mastermind, Juan Franco, have been responsible for its production. The company specialises in complex metal works mainly for the Swiss watchmaking and jewellery industry.

Broadcasting

Source: FIVB.com

Fans
More than a half million fans (563,263) have watched the matches so far, smashing the previous records in the competition. In Italy four years ago, the total was 339,324, while in Japan in 2006 it was 298,352.
The first round alone topped the numbers achieved by the World Championship in Italy four years ago.
The average number of spectators per match was 5,469. Not surprisingly, Poland have been the most popular team with a total of 173,234 fans attending their games, 60,000 more than the second-ranked team Serbia.

See also
2014 FIVB Volleyball Women's World Championship

Notes

References

External links

Official website 
Official website 
Final Standing
Awards
Prize Money
Statistics
Highlights World Championship

 
FIVB Volleyball Men's World Championship
FIVB Volleyball Men's World Championship
FIVB Volleyball Men's World Championship
International volleyball competitions hosted by Poland
August 2014 sports events in Europe
September 2014 sports events in Europe